Geoffrey Keezer (born November 20, 1970) is an American jazz pianist. In 2023, he won the Best Instrumental Composition Grammy   for Refuge

Keezer was playing in jazz clubs as a teenager, playing piano for Art Blakey at age 18 and touring with Joshua Redman, Benny Golson and Ray Brown in his 20s. He has toured with David Sanborn, Chris Botti, Joe Locke and Christian McBride and worked with vocalist Denise Donatelli, receiving Grammy Award nominations, and releasing albums influenced by Hawaiian, Okinawan, and Afro-Peruvian folk traditions.

His 2009 album Áurea was nominated for a Grammy Award for Best Latin Jazz Album; in 2010 he was nominated for Best Instrumental Arrangement Accompanying Vocalist(s) for "Don't Explain" on Denise Donatelli's album When Lights Are Low. In 2013 Keezer released his first solo piano album in 13 years, Heart of the Piano (Motéma Music).

Early life 
Born in Eau Claire, the son of Mary Ann Graham, a professional French Horn player, and Ronald Willard Keezer, a composer/percussionist and member of the music faculty at the University of Wisconsin-Eau Claire,<ref name="RWKobit">"Obituary: Ronald Keezer". Eau Claire Leader-Telegram'. June 21, 2020. p. A5. Retrieved July 28, 2022.</ref> Geoff Keezer attended Putnam Heights Elementary School, South Junior High School, and Memorial High School, graduating in 1988.

 Performing and recording 
In 1989, after attending Berklee College of Music for one year, Keezer joined Art Blakey and the Jazz Messengers, becoming the last pianist to join the band. He composed and arranged original music for the group, with which he remained until Blakey's death in 1990. Keezer's debut album as a leader, Waiting in the Wings (Sunnyside) came out in 1989.

1990s
Keezer joined the Art Farmer Quartet in 1990. The band performed at major North American jazz festivals and jazz clubs. Keezer served as musical director and arranger from 1994 to 1995. In 1997, Keezer became a member of bassist Ray Brown's trio. He toured the world with Brown, performing at clubs and major festivals in North America, Japan, Europe and the Middle East. The Ray Brown Trio played concerts with the Israel Philharmonic; the Radio Orchestra of Munich at the Weiner Konzerthaus and Conservatory in Vienna, Austria; and at Lincoln Center in New York City.

During the 1990s, he toured with The Key Players, featuring Mulgrew Miller, James Williams, Harold Mabern & Donald Brown; a performance of Gershwin's Rhapsody in Blue with the Hollywood Bowl Orchestra; a concert with the Gerry Mulligan Quartet at London's Albert Hall; a concert at Lincoln Center with Art Farmer and Wynton Marsalis; and performances with the Carnegie Hall Jazz Orchestra, the Slide Hampton All-Stars, Dizzy Gillespie, J. J. Johnson and many others. He also traveled many times to Japan, where he played with Ray Brown Michael Brecker, Pat Metheny and Kenny Burrell.

His second album, Curveball, came out in 1990 and featured Victor Lewis on drums; Charnett Moffett on bass and Steve Nelson on vibes. He returned the next year with Here & Now (Somethin' Else, 1991); followed by World Music (DIW, 1992); Other Spheres (DIW, 1993); Trio (Sackville, 1995); a duet album with Harold Mabern called For Phineas (Sackville, 1996); and Turn Up the Quiet (Sony, 1997), which featured rising stars Diana Krall, Joshua Redman and Christian McBride. Keezer also appeared on many albums as a sideman.

2000s
From 2000 to 2009 Keezer performed on keyboards and piano in the Christian McBride Band. The band toured North America, Europe and Japan. Keezer contributed original compositions and arrangement. Concurrently, starting in 2002, Keezer joined saxophonist Tim Garland's Storms/Nocturnes project. The band played throughout the United Kingdom, including at Queen Elizabeth Hall in London; the Hollywell Music Room in Oxford; the Royal Northern College of Music in Manchester; and at the Cheltenham Jazz Festival. In 2004, Keezer traveled to Lima, Peru, to play with Maria Schneider. This visit to Peru would later provide the inspiration for his GRAMMY-nominated album Aurea.

The following year saw Keezer again touring the world, this time with saxophonist David Sanborn. Then in 2007, Keezer began playing with Grammy Award-winning trumpeter Chris Botti, a relationship that continues to this day. That same year, Keezer received a grant from Chamber Music America to develop a new jazz work. In 2009, Keezer joined the band of fellow Art Blakey alumnus Wayne Shorter, subbing for an injured Danilo Perez. Keezer played at the Playboy Jazz Festival and at festivals in Ottawa and Montreal as a member of the Wayne Shorter Quartet.

His albums include the solo piano recording Zero One (Dreyfus, 2000), as well as Sublime: Honoring the Music of Hank Jones (Telarc, 2003), a series of duets with pianists Kenny Barron, Chick Corea, Benny Green and Mulgrew Miller. Other albums include Falling Up (Maxjazz, 2003) with Hawaiian slack key guitarist Keola Beamer; Free Association (ArtistShare, 2005) with guitarist Jim Hall; Wildcrafted: Live at the Dakota (MaxJazz, 2005); Live in Seattle (Origin, 2006); an album with Okinawan singer Yasukatsu Oshima; a collaboration with electronica artist Mary Acheta called The Near Forever (2009); and Áurea (ArtistShare, 2009), which was nominated for a 2009 Grammy Award for Best Latin Jazz Album.

2010–present
In 2010, Keezer was nominated for his second Grammy Award, for Best Instrumental Arrangement Accompanying Vocalist(s), for the track "Don't Explain" on Denise Donatelli's When Lights Are Low. From 2012 to 2013, Keezer played concerts in Hawaii and across North America as part of the "Malama Ko Aloha" tour featuring Hawaiian slack-key guitarist Keola Beamer and native American flute player R. Carlos Nakai.

Recordings from this period include Mill Creek Road (SBE, 2011); Via (Origin, 2011) with Joe Locke on vibes and Tim Garland on saxophone; Signing (Motéma, 2012) also with Locke; and his latest solo piano recording, Heart of the Piano (Motéma, 2013).

Since 2016, Keezer has frequently performed with his wife, vocalist Gillian Margot.Anderson, Charlie (June 5, 2017). "Live Review: Keezer & Margot at The Verdict". Sussex Jazz Magazine. "Beginning with a masterclass, in association with Brighton Jazz School (of which Keezer is a patron), husband and wife team Geoffrey Keezer and Gillian Margot answered questions from the audience that covered everything from musical empathy, rubato, introductions, rhythm, song choice and solo improvisations.""Geoffrey Keezer & Gillian Margot - Blue Note at Home". Facebook. May 31, 2020. Retrieved July 28, 2022.

 Television 
Keezer appeared on German television in 1989 with Art Blakey. In 1995, he appeared on NBC's Today Show as part of the Terence Blanchard Quintet. In the late 1990s, he played on German, French and Swiss TV as a member of the Ray Brown Trio. In 2000, he joined Ingrid Jensen on BET's Jazz Central Station. Keezer appeared on Japan's NHK in 2005 during their coverage of that year's Tokyo Jazz Festival. In 2012, Keezer played on ABC's Good Morning America and The View in a band with Chris Botti and country star Vince Gill.

 Teaching 
Keezer is a jazz faculty member at the Juilliard School  and William Paterson University.

He has taught master classes at the Brubeck Institute, the Royal Academy of Music, the Thelonious Monk Institute of Jazz, The New School, the Stanford Jazz Workshop, Indiana University, Michigan State University, the Jazzschool, Jazz Aspen, the Amsterdam College for the Arts, the Guildhall School of Music and The Hartt School of Music.

He also has three online courses a course with the online jazz lessons platform, Open Studio, "The Keez to Jazz Piano", "Advanced Jazz Piano Concepts" and "Elements of Solo Piano".

 Discography 
As leader/co-leader

As sideman
With Art Blakey
 Chippin' In (Timeless, 1990)
 One for All (A&M, 1990)
With Ray Brown
 Summertime: Ray Brown Trio with Ulf Wakenius (Telarc, 1997)
 Christmas Songs with The Ray Brown Trio (Telarc, 1999)
 Some of My Best Friends Are ... Piano Players (Telarc, 2000)
 Some of My Best Friends Are ... Trumpet Players (Telarc, 2000)
 Live At Starbucks (Telarc, 2001)
 Some of My Best Friends Are ... Singers (Telarc, 2002)
 Some of My Best Friends Are ... Guitarists (Telarc, 2002)
 Walk On: The Final Ray Brown Trio Recording, and Previously Unreleased Recordings (Telarc, 2003)
With Art Farmer
 Soul Eyes (Enja, 1991)
 The Company I Keep (Arabesque, 1994) with Tom Harrell
 The Meaning of Art (Arabesque, 1995)
 Silk Road (Arabesque, 1997)
With Ricky Ford
 Hard Groovin' (Muse, 1989)
With Benny GolsonTenor Legacy (Arkadia Jazz, 1996 [1998])One Day, Forever (Arkadia Jazz, 1996 [2001])
With Christian McBrideVertical Vision (Warner Bros., 2002)
With Yasukatsu OshimaYasukatsu Oshima with Geoffrey Keezer'' (Sony Japan, 2007)

References

External links
 
 Official site

1970 births
ArtistShare artists
American jazz pianists
American male jazz musicians
American male pianists
Blue Note Records artists
Grammy Award winners
Living people
Motéma Music artists
People from Eau Claire, Wisconsin
Sackville Records artists
Sunnyside Records artists
Telarc Records artists
The Jazz Messengers members